, formerly known as , is a Japanese voice actress and singer from Tokyo. Some of her major roles are Aoi in Wish Upon the Pleiades original net animation (ONA) and its anime adaptation, Eila Ilmatar Juutilainen in Strike Witches, Adele in Horizon in the Middle of Nowhere, Oryō in Girls und Panzer, and Anju Yuuki in Love Live! School Idol project. She was associated with ToriTori agency until June 2015. She is currently associated with Mausu Promotion.

Filmography

Anime

Television series

Films

Video games

Discography

Singles

Compilation albums

References

External links
  
 Official agency profile 
 

1984 births
Living people
Voice actresses from Tokyo
Japanese video game actresses
Japanese voice actresses
Singers from Tokyo
21st-century Japanese actresses
21st-century Japanese women singers
21st-century Japanese singers
A-Rise members
Mausu Promotion voice actors